Maxim Nikolaevich Bets (born January 31, 1974) is a Russian former professional ice hockey player who played three games in the National Hockey League for the Mighty Ducks of Anaheim.

Career
Bets began his career in Russia with Traktor Chelyabinsk before moving to North America in the junior Western Hockey League where he spent two highly productive seasons with the Spokane Chiefs, scoring 49 points and 57 assists for 106 points in 1992–93 and 46 goals and 70 assists for 116 points in 1993–94, finishing second for the team between Valeri Bure and Ryan Duthie respectively.

Bets was drafted 37th overall by the St. Louis Blues in the 1993 NHL Entry Draft, but while with the Chiefs, his rights were traded to the Mighty Ducks of Anaheim for fellow Russian Alexei Kasatonov and played three games for the Mighty Ducks during the 1993–94 NHL season but failed to register a point.  It turned out to be Bets' only NHL experience as he spent the rest of his time in North America with spells with the San Diego Gulls of the IHL, the Worcester IceCats and the Baltimore Bandits of the AHL and the Raleigh IceCaps of the ECHL.

Bets returned to Russia in 1996 in the Russian Superleague with one season spells with HC CSKA Moscow, Traktor Chelyabinsk, Mechel Chelyabinsk and Metallurg Magnitogorsk.  He rejoined Mechel Chelyabinsk for another season before spending another season playing for Severstal Cherepovets and then split the 2002–03 season with Molot-Prikamye Perm and Krylya Sovetov Moscow.

In 2003, he returned to Mechel Chelyabinsk a third time who were now playing in the Vysshaya Liga and spent three seasons with the team joining Traktor Chelyabinsk for a third spell at the conclusion of the 2005–06 season.  He spent a season with Kazakhmis Satpaev before joining Mechel Chelyabinsk for a fourth time.  In 2008, Bets signed with Gazprom-OGU Orenburg.

Career statistics

Regular season and playoffs

International

External links
 

1974 births
Baltimore Bandits players
HC CSKA Moscow players
HC Mechel players
Gazprom-OGU Orenburg players
Kazakhmys Satpaev players
Krylya Sovetov Moscow players
Living people
Metallurg Magnitogorsk players
Mighty Ducks of Anaheim players
Molot-Prikamye Perm players
Raleigh IceCaps players
Russian ice hockey left wingers
St. Louis Blues draft picks
San Diego Gulls (IHL) players
Severstal Cherepovets players
Spokane Chiefs players
Sportspeople from Chelyabinsk
Traktor Chelyabinsk players
Worcester IceCats players